This list summarizes the mosques in the Netherlands. As of 2010, there are 453 mosques in the Netherlands.

See also
 List of mosques in Europe

External links

 
Mosques
Netherlands